The imperial election of October 1, 1410 was an imperial election held to select the emperor of the Holy Roman Empire.

Background 
The previous Holy Roman Emperor, Rupert, King of Germany, died on May 18, 1410.  Three of the prince-electors of the Holy Roman Empire convened at the imperial election of September 20, 1410 to elect Sigismund, Holy Roman Emperor, king of Hungary and son of a previous emperor, Charles IV, Holy Roman Emperor.  They were:-

1. Frederick I, Elector of Brandenburg, burgrave of Nuremberg, who claimed to act on behalf of Jobst of Moravia, elector of Brandenburg and Rupert's nephew, without his knowledge or consent. 

2. Louis III, Elector Palatine.

3. Werner von Falkenstein, Archbishop of Trier.

The remaining electors (those of "Bohemia [ Wenceslaus IV of Bohemia ], Cologne [Friedrich III von Saarwerden], Mayence [Mainz] [Johann II von Nassau], Saxony [ Rudolf III, Duke of Saxe-Wittenberg ] and Brandenburg [ Jobst of Moravia himself]") did not accept Sigismund, and convened on October 1 to elect Rupert's successor.

Elected 
Jobst was elected.

Aftermath 
Jobst died, possibly by poisoning, on January 18, 1411.  Sigismund would be elected in the imperial election of 1411.

References

1410
1410 in the Holy Roman Empire
15th-century elections
Non-partisan elections